The 1957 European Shotgun Championships was the 2nd edition of the global shotgun competition, European Shotgun Championships, organised by the International Shooting Sport Federation.

Results

Men

Women

Medal table

See also
 European Shooting Confederation
 International Shooting Sport Federation
 List of medalists at the European Shotgun Championships

References

External links
 
 European Champion Archive Results at Sport-komplett-de

European Shotgun Championships
European Shotgun Championships